Hong Kong competed at the 1972 Summer Olympics in Munich, West Germany. Ten competitors, all men, took part in 13 events in 5 sports.

 Matthew Chan Wan Hei - Fencing
 Mark Anthony Crocker - Swimming
 Robert Elliot - Fencing
 Gilbert Lennox-King - sailing
 Mok Cheuk Wing - judo
 Peter Rull, Sr. (Estonia) - Shooting     
 Wong Man Chiu "Ronnie" - Swimming     
 Colin Smith - sailing
 Bill Steele - sailing
 Kenneth Tomlins - sailing

Fencing

Two fencers represented Hong Kong in 1972.

Men's foil
 Chan Wan Hei
 Robert Elliott

Men's épée
 Chan Wan Hei
 Robert Elliott

Men's sabre
 Chan Wan Hei
 Robert Elliott

Judo

 Mok Cheuk Wing -  Men's 70 kg

Sailing

 Colin Smith & Bill Steele - Flying Dutchman
 Kenneth Tomlins & Gilbert Lennox-King - Tempest

Shooting

One shooter represented Hong Kong in 1972.

50 m rifle, prone
 Peter Rull, Sr.

Swimming

Men's 100m Freestyle
Ronnie Man Chiu Wong
 Heat — 57.53s (→  did not advance)

Men's 200m Freestyle
Mark Anthony Crocker
 Heat — 2:12.85 (→  did not advance)

References

External links
Official Olympic Reports

Nations at the 1972 Summer Olympics
1972 Summer Olympics
1972 in Hong Kong sport